Euagrotis was a genus of moths of the family Noctuidae. It is now considered a subgenus of Anicla by Don Lafontaine et al. All species of Euagrotis were moved to Anicla.

References
Natural History Museum Lepidoptera genus database
Euagrotis made a subgenus of Anicla

Noctuinae